Mike Ford (born July 26, 1952) is a Canadian retired professional ice hockey player who played 233 games in the World Hockey Association for the Winnipeg Jets and Calgary Cowboys.

External links

1952 births
Living people
Brandon Wheat Kings players
Canadian ice hockey defencemen
Calgary Cowboys players
Detroit Red Wings draft picks
Düsseldorfer EG players
EHC Freiburg players
Füchse Duisburg players
Frölunda HC players
Ice hockey people from Ottawa
Kölner Haie players
Port Huron Wings players
Winnipeg Jets (WHA) players
Canadian expatriate ice hockey players in Germany
Canadian expatriate ice hockey players in Sweden